Model N can refer to:

 Curtiss Model N,  a floatplane
 Ford Model N, an automobile by the Ford Motor Company
 Model N Engine, by the Ford Motor Company
 Model N (company), a software company